The 2014 GEICO 500 was a NASCAR Sprint Cup Series stock car race that was held on October 19, 2014, at Talladega Superspeedway in Lincoln, Alabama. Contested over 188 laps on the 2.66-mile (4.28 km) super speedway, it was the 32nd race of the 2014 Sprint Cup Series season, as well as the sixth race of ten in the Chase for the Sprint Cup. Brad Keselowski held off hard charges from Ryan Newman, Matt Kenseth and Landon Cassill to score his sixth win of the season. Matt Kenseth finished second, while Clint Bowyer, Landon Cassill, and Ryan Newman rounded out the top five. The top rookies of the race were Austin Dillon (13th), Cole Whitt (15th), and Kyle Larson (17th).

Previous week's race
Kevin Harvick shot ahead of Jeff Gordon on the final restart with two laps to go to win the Bank of America 500 at Charlotte Motor Speedway. “Oh, we came here and tested thinking that this was going to be the hardest round to get through because of Talladega,” Harvick said. “There’s so much that you can’t control there. We wanted to try to control the things that we could control. We felt like Kansas and here (Charlotte) were playing to our strengths; and just see where it fell after that once we get to the next round. So I’m really proud of everybody at SHR. I’m really proud of all my guys on this team. I just can’t thank everybody enough.” "I'm really proud of that finish, really proud of that effort," Gordon said. " ... Kevin was tough. I knew he was going to be tough once he got out there."

Report

Background
Talladega Superspeedway is a motorsports complex located north of Talladega, Alabama, United States. It is located on the former Anniston Air Force Base in the small city of Lincoln. The track is a Tri-oval and was constructed by International Speedway Corporation, a business controlled by the France Family, in the 1960s. Talladega is most known for its steep banking and the unique location of the start/finish line - which is closer to turn one than at Daytona. The track currently hosts the NASCAR series such as the Cup Series, Xfinity Series, and the Craftsman Truck Series. Talladega Superspeedway is the longest NASCAR oval with a length of 2.66 miles (4.28 km), and the track at its peak had a seating capacity of 175,000 spectators, although the current capacity is 80,000 seats.

Two-time series champion Terry Labonte made his 890th and final career start. “This is the third time I’ve run my last race,” Labonte told SiriusXM NASCAR Radio on Friday. “It’s been fun. It’s been exciting. I wish I was 10 years younger.”

Knockout rule changes
On September 4, NASCAR announced changes to the knockout format for Daytona and Talladega in an effort to speed up the qualifying process.

The following modifications were made to the knockout qualifying format for restrictor plate races.  All other rules first implemented at the Las Vegas race will continue to be used.

 All rounds of qualifying will be five minutes.
 In the first round, competitors will be assigned to one of two qualifying round group based on the random draw held earlier in the event.
 Each half of the first round is five minutes each.
 Regardless of which round the driver's fast time was set, the 24 fastest competitors combined between the two rounds advance to the second round.
 The first break between rounds is ten minutes.
 The second break between rounds is five minutes.

“This revision in national series qualifying at Talladega should be more exciting for our fans,” said Robin Pemberton, NASCAR senior vice president of competition and racing development. “It will feature a more accelerated pace, provide greater opportunity for team strategy to come into play and it should more closely resemble actual racing conditions.”

Practice and qualifying
Like a half a straightaway behind the whole field and they all checked up and gave me a chance and gave me a run.’’ Justin Allgaier, Joe Nemechek and Ricky Stenhouse Jr. failed to qualify. “I thought being the last car in line would be beneficial for us,’’ Stenhouse said. “We had Jeff Gordon leading the pack there I thought we would have a good shot at putting a good lap in, but my spotter was telling me, ‘Hey, you have 30 seconds to get across the start-finish line’ as we were entering Turn 3. I don’t guess Eddie d'Hondt (No. 24 team spotter) was giving him a lot of information. He kept slowing the pack down, and we didn’t get a good lap and never got across the start-finish line in time. My spotter was giving me the information I needed, and I wish (Gordon’s spotter) would have been doing the same.” Jeff Gordon started 43rd for only the second time in his career. “The plan was shot before the plan started,’’ Gordon said. “I messed up ultimately. I just mistimed getting to the line. The whole group was going so slow, I knew I had to have a gap. When I came across the line, I thought I had enough to be able to complete that lap and get one more, which was the only way we were going to be to make it (to the second round), but we came up short. It’s a mess out there. It’s not easy.’’ Originally, Nemechek made it through the first round, but his time was disallowed after the oil tank encasement was found to be improperly installed. This allowed Reed Sorenson, who originally failed to qualify, to start the race. Brad Keselowski qualified fifth, but due to an alternator change (parc fermé rules are in effect at Talladega), started from the rear along with Matt Kenseth, who changed an engine. Terry Labonte, who made his final start, qualified ninth (although he had to go to the rear of the field due after NASCAR made the team change their paint scheme). It was his best qualifying performance since Sonoma 2005. "You know, it's only about the third time I've said this is gonna be my last race, but this is really gonna be the last one," he said Saturday. "It's been fun."

Race

First half

Start

The race started with Brian Vickers leading the field to the green. He didn't hold the lead for long as Jimmie Johnson took the lead from him on lap one, but Ryan Blaney took the lead from Johnson on lap two.
Then Johnson retook the lead on lap 15.
Johnson ducked onto pit road to make his first stop of the race on lap 39.

The first caution of the race flew on lap 60 when Jamie McMurray cut a tire and turned down into Joey Logano past the exit of turn 4. "It's not destroyed, but it's pushed in. I see zero damage behind the exhaust," Keselowski's spotter Joey Meier reported to the crew. Jimmie Johnson took the lead back from Kahne when the leaders pitted.

The race restarted on lap 66. Dale Earnhardt Jr. took the lead on lap 75. Just as the leaders were preparing to make their scheduled stop, the second caution of the race flew on lap 103 for a large crash on the backstretch. It started when Aric Almirola hooked J. J. Yeley into the backstretch wall, and collecting 8 more cars with Kyle Busch taking the worst hit. "We are destroyed...it's everything," Busch lamented on his car radio. J. J. Yeley, Kyle Busch, Aric Almirola, Austin Dillon, A. J. Allmendinger, Alex Bowman, Brian Vickers, Tony Stewart, Clint Bowyer and Terry Labonte were involved in the incident. "We had rear end damage, we got hit from behind, forced us into somebody in the front," team owner Joe Gibbs said in the garage as the crew made repairs. "The whole front fascia is gone. Our guys have done a great job, but we’ve had to replace a lot of the front end." "We were just all starting to shuffle around there and getting ready to pit, and I think it was the 83 in front of me, and I think he might have been trying to check up to get to the bottom," said Almirola. "I just barely started to push him and it hooked his car and we all wrecked." "It's disappointing," Rogers told FOXSports.com. "Everyone on this team has been executing really well, and I'm really proud of them, but something happened out of our control and took us out of the Chase. That's part of this sport. That's part of it. We all knew it coming into Talladega. We're the unfortunate victims this time. Kyle is ... I can’t praise him enough," said Rogers. "He has really stepped up to be a great leader of this race team in the Chase and we've had a couple things go against us - getting the nose knocked off at Loudon, today, and Kyle's done a really good job of biting his lip and just backing the race team and letting us do our job. Kyle, I can't say enough good about him. I'm really proud of him. It's been a lot of fun working with him through this Chase, and we're not done yet." David Gilliland stayed out when the leaders pitted and assumed the lead. He made a stop and handed the lead to Jeff Gordon. He stopped and gave the lead to Ryan Blaney.

Second half
The race restarted on lap 109, but the caution flew for the third time on lap 131 after Michael McDowell slammed the wall in turn 4. Cole Whitt stayed out when the leaders pitted to take the lead. He pitted the next lap and handed the lead back to Johnson.

The race restarted on lap 136, and remanded green, until Kyle Larson spun on the apron of turn 1 and brought out the fourth caution of the race with 14 laps to go. Jeff Gordon was the only car who hadn't pitted and had to give up the lead to stop for fuel. Ryan Newman cycled to the lead.

Debris brought out the fifth caution with five laps to go, so the race went past its advertised distance and went into overtime. The first overtime attempt, resulted in another crash on the backstretch that collected 5 cars. It started when David Gilliland tapped Greg Biffle who clipped Dale Earnhardt Jr. and collected two more cars. Brad Keselowski was ahead of race leader Newman and assumed the lead.

Brad Keselowski held off hard charging Ryan Newman and Matt Kenseth to win the race with the pack behind them, being stacked up. “I can’t believe it,” Keselowski said. “Talladega is such a wild card and to be able to win here you have to catch breaks and make your own breaks, a little of both. I can’t believe we won at Talladega. This race is the scariest of the three in the bracket. To be able to win here is really a privilege, it really is.” Kyle Busch, Dale Earnhardt Jr., Kasey Kahne and Jimmie Johnson were the four drivers who were eliminated. "We had a real good car most of the day," Earnhardt said. "Got real loose, kind of shuffled out. ... It's just hard racing. That's the way it goes at the end of these races. We weren't in good position."

Notables
This was the last race for Terry Labonte. Go FAS Racing planned a paint scheme mimicking his time in NASCAR, with the driver's side similar to his 1996 championship season and the passenger side painted like his 1984 car. Go FAS Racing had to change it after qualifying, since NASCAR mandates the left and right side must be identical and the team went with the 1996 style.

Circle Sport Racing had their best career finishes with a sixth place from Travis Kvapil and fourth from Landon Cassill, marking the first top five and top ten finishes for Cassill and the team.

Reed Sorenson finished a respectable 14th, considering that his Tommy Baldwin Racing car only got in after Joe Nemechek's time was disallowed.

Post-race
Ryan Newman's car was found to be too low in the rear on both sides in post-race inspections. However, this was found to be caused by race damage, so no penalties were issued.

Results

Qualifying

Race results

Race statistics
 38 lead changes among different drivers
 6 cautions for 25 laps
 Time of race: 3:13:09
 Brad Keselowski won his sixth race in 2014

Standings after the race

Drivers' Championship standings

Manufacturers' Championship standings

Note: Only the first sixteen positions are included for the driver standings.

Notes

References

GEICO 500
GEICO 500
GEICO 500
NASCAR races at Talladega Superspeedway